The Day is the third studio album by Japanese rock band Deen. It was released on 16 December 1998 under Berg label records. The album consists of previous 2 released singles, Kimi Sae Ireba and Tegotae no nai Ai. Both of these singles were composed and written by Japanese singer and songwriter Miho Komatsu.

This is the first album released at the BMG JAPAN Incorporation. Although they moved from Being Inc. agency, several staff members as Daisuke Ikeda, Hirohito Furui and Akihito Tokunaga continued cooperating with them.

The album reached #9 in its first week and charted for 6 weeks, selling 143,420 copies.

Track listing

In media
Kimi Sae Ireba - opening theme for Anime television series Chūka Ichiban!
Tegotae no Nai Ai - ending theme for TBS program Muscle Ranking
A day in my life - radio commercial song for Kyushu Electric Power

Cover
Miho Komatsu covered Tegotae no nai Ai in her album Mirai and Kimi Sae Ireba in Hanano.

References

Sony Music albums
Japanese-language albums
1998 albums
Deen (band) albums